Spirit of the Wild is the eleventh studio album by American hard rock musician Ted Nugent. It was released in May 1995 by Atlantic Records. The album was produced by Mike Lutz from the Brownsville Station rock band and engineered by Lutz and Jim Vitti. It is Nugent's only album released in the 1990s.

Spirit of the Wild marked the return of Nugent's original sound of hard rock instead of the pop metal style of his '80s solo work, as well as the brief return of vocalist Derek St. Holmes. "Spirit of the Wild" is the theme song for Nugent's hunting TV show Spirit of the Wild. The sixth track "Fred Bear" is a tribute to the bowman Fred Bear.

Track listing

Personnel
Band members
 Ted Nugent – guitar, lead vocals (except where noted), lyrics, attitude, backstraps and security, producer
 Derek St. Holmes – lead vocals (tracks 1, 2, 5, 7, 10, 11)
 Mike Lutz – bass, keyboards, vocals, producer, engineer, mixing
 Denny Carmassi – drums

Additional musicians
 Larry Fratangelo – percussion
 Benny Rappa – drums (track 2), background vocals (tracks 2, 10)
 Gunner Ross – drums (track 6)
 Doug Banker – piano (track 8), background vocals (tracks 9, 11), management

Production
 Jim Vitti – engineer, mixing
 Brian Delaney, Jeff Campo – assistant engineers
 George Marino – mastering
 Donald May – art direction
 Steve Galli – cover photographer from Cobo Arena, Detroit, Michigan, January 1, 1995

References

1995 albums
Ted Nugent albums
Atlantic Records albums